George Frend (born 1970) is a former Irish hurling player. He played hurling with his local club Toomevara and with the Tipperary senior inter-county team from 1992 to 1999. In 1989 he won an All-Ireland Under-21 Hurling Championship medal as Tipperary defeated Offaly in the final.

He made his championship debut in 1992 against Cork in a 2-12 to 1-12 defeat at Páirc Uí Chaoimh.
He captained Tipperary to win the National Hurling League in 1994.

References

External links
Tipperary Archives Profile

1970 births
Living people
Toomevara hurlers
Tipperary inter-county hurlers
Munster inter-provincial hurlers